Kuai Liang ( 190s–200s), courtesy name Zirou, was an adviser to the warlord Liu Biao during the late Eastern Han dynasty of China. He was from Zhonglu County, Nan Commandery, which is located southwest of present-day Xiangyang, Hubei. He had a younger brother, Kuai Yue.

In Romance of the Three Kingdoms
In the 14th-century historical novel Romance of the Three Kingdoms, Kuai Liang comes up with a plan to defeat Sun Jian at the Battle of Xiangyang in 191. He suggests to Huang Zu to retreat and lure Sun Jian to Xianshan, where Sun Jian is killed by Huang Zu's archers lying in ambush.

See also
 Lists of people of the Three Kingdoms

References

 Chen, Shou (3rd century). Records of the Three Kingdoms (Sanguozhi).
 Luo, Guanzhong (14th century). Romance of the Three Kingdoms (Sanguo Yanyi).
 Pei, Songzhi (5th century). Annotations to Records of the Three Kingdoms (Sanguozhi zhu).

2nd-century births
Year of death unknown
Liu Biao and associates
People from Xiangyang